The total electricity consumption of the Netherlands in 2021 was 117 terawatt-hour (TWh). The consumption grew from 7 TWh in 1950 by an average of 4.5% per year. As of 2021, the main resources for electricity in the Netherlands are fossil fuels, such as natural gas and coal. In 2021, fossil fuels accounted for about 62% of the produced electricity. Renewable energy sources, such as biomass, wind power and solar power, produce 38% of the total electricity. There is one nuclear plant in the Netherlands, in Borssele, which is responsible for about 3% of total generation. The majority of the electricity, more than 75%, is produced centrally by thermal and nuclear units.

From 2005 to 2008, the Netherlands imported 13–15% of its electricity. After 2008, however, the share of imported electricity went down drastically; in 2009, the Netherlands became a net exporter of electricity. Then, in 2011, the import balance increased again sharply. This development continued in 2012 and 2013. From 56.1 PJ in 2010, to almost twice the amount in 2015: 110.7 PJ. The cause of the increase in electricity imports has to do with the development of energy prices. The natural gas price rose sharply in 2011 and 2012, while the price of coal rose again in 2011, but fell sharply in 2012 and 2013. Additionally, the supply of cheap electricity in neighbouring countries rose relatively strongly, which made imports more attractive.

Before 1998, utilities were allowed to own an electricity network and sell the electricity at the same time, which gave companies that owned the network unfair advantages over companies that were only active in the retail of electricity. This prompted a restructuring of the electricity sector in the Netherlands with the introduction of the Electricity Act in 1998. This Act demanded the decoupling between utilities and electricity supply. Generation and retail of electricity in the Netherlands were liberalised. However, the transmission and distribution were and are still centralised and operated by the system operator and the utilities. The system operator and utilities have a monopoly position in the energy market. Therefore, to guarantee the rights of consumers and businesses in the electricity sector, these parties have to be regulated. Authority for Consumers and Markets was founded to this end in 2013.

The system operator, TenneT, is the only stakeholder responsible for managing the high-voltage grid (between a voltage of 110 kV to 380 kV) in the Netherlands. There are seven utility companies that own the regional energy grids: Cogas Infra en Beheer, Enduris, Enexis, Liander, Stedin Netbeheer, and Westland Infra Netbeheer.

Electricity per person and by power source 

In 2008, the Netherlands consumed electricity on average 7,463 kWh/person, which was equal to the EU15 average (EU15: 7,409 kWh/person). In 2014, this 6,713 kWh/person, which is a decrease of 10% compared to 2008.

Coal-based power generation 
The Netherlands has five coal-fired plants. Three new coal-fired plants were opened from 2015–2016, two in the Maasvlakte and one in the Eemshaven. At the same time three old plants were closed down in Nijmegen, Borssele and Geertruidenberg. Additionally, two other plants (Maasvlakte I and II) are planned to be closed before 1 July 2017. A discussion is taking place on what to do with the operational five coal-fired plants, whether they should be closed down or not. However, according to the government the remaining five plants should stay open because the Netherlands depends on the energy produced by these coal-fired plants. The tables show an overview of the operational and recently closed/opened coal-fired power plants in the Netherlands.

Operational

Closed

Use 

According to IEA, the electricity use (gross production + imports – exports – transmission/distribution losses) in the Netherlands in 2008 was 119 TWh. In 2014, the electricity use decreased to 113 TWh. The electricity generated by wind energy increased from 1990 to 2013 by an average of 19% per year to 2,713 MW. In 2013, wind energy generates 9% of the total electricity power in the Netherlands – compared to 3.9% in 2009. The wind capacity installed at end 2010 would, in a normal wind year, produce 4,1% of the total electricity, while the equivalent value for Germany is 9,4%, Portugal 14%, and Denmark 39% in 2014.

The Netherlands has three connections with Germany and two with Belgium, both alternating current power lines. Additionally, it has direct current (HVDC) submarine power cables to Norway (the 700 MW NorNed cable since 2008), with England (the 1,000 MW BritNed cable since 2011), and with Denmark (the 700 MW COBRAcable cable since 2019. Possibilities to connect wind farms to this cable are being looked into. In addition, a fourth connection with Germany is being realised.

A 24 MW / 48 MWh grid battery opened in 2022.

Global warming
The total emissions of carbon dioxide per capita in 2007 were 11.1 tons CO2. This compares to the EU27 average 7.9 tons CO2. Emissions grew with 16.4% between 1990 and 2007. However, compared between 2002 and 2012, the emission per capita had decreased with 6.1%, to 10.4 ton CO2. Additionally, the IEA showed that for a longer time period, from 1990 to 2012, there was a reduction in emissions of 8%, while GDP grew by around 50% in this same period. Emissions per capita in the OECD countries exceeded the Netherlands only in Czech Republic 11.8, Finland 12.2, Canada 17.4, Australia 18.8, the United States 19.1 and Luxembourg 22.4.

Energy Agreement for Sustainable Growth 
On 6 September 2013 representatives from the Dutch government, environmentalists and the energy sector, in total 47 different parties, signed the Energy Agreement. This agreement contains plans for investing in energy conservation and renewable energy generation. It is projected to deliver tens of thousands of new jobs, improve industry competitiveness and increase exports. Additionally, the stakeholders agreed that 16% of the energy would be generated by renewable energy sources in 2023. Five coal-fired plants, which were built in the eighties, would be closed in 2016 and 2017. The other remaining five coal-fired plants would remain open and are used for co-firing of biomass, a 4 billion euro measure, which would contribute 1.2% of the total production of renewable energy. This agreement was seen as a major breakthrough in the debate about climate change in the Netherlands, because it not only provided a clear set of policies for sustainable growth, but was also supported by the main stakeholders.

Resistance Energy Agreement 
However, not everybody supported the Energy Agreement. The foundation Urgenda, an environmental organisation, did not sign the agreement. According to Urgenda, the agreement is a weak compromise without any sense of urgency; therefore, they sued the Dutch government on 20 November 2013. They accused the Dutch state of acting unlawfully by not contributing its proportional share to preventing global warming. The hearing of the case took place on 14 April 2015. Then, on 24 June 2015, the verdict came; Urgenda won the case. The Dutch government was required to take more effective climate action in reducing the Netherlands’ considerable share in global emissions. This was the first time that a judge had legally required a State to take precautions against climate change. Although many politicians asked for action instead of delaying the transition to a more sustainable society, the government appealed the verdict. The reason, according to the government, is that they questioned the way the court assessed their policy. They promised, however, that new measures to comply with the verdict would still be carried out. Urgenda described the appeal as a delaying tactic. Additionally, 28,000 citizens signed a petition that the government should accept the verdict.

Debate about closure of coal-firing plants 
Then, in October 2015 the National Energy Exploration showed that the measures set by the agreement would fail to reach the goals set by the Energy agreement. Many politicians lost their confidence in the agreement and demanded an additional set of measures. In December 2015, the majority of the House of Representatives supported the closure of all Dutch coal-firing plants in the near future. A policy contradiction was created; closing the additional coal-firing plants would simultaneously go against the Energy Agreement, because it would make the co-firing of biomass impossible. Additionally, three new coal plants were just finished and costed 1.5 billion euros each. However, the politicians suggested using the subsidies for co-firing biomass as compensation to close the new coal-firing plants. However, some politicians were against the plan, because they were afraid that it would cost too many jobs.

Since the motion of Urgenda, the Cabinet and other involved parties have been negotiating possible solutions. Nuon, the Dutch subsidiary of the Swedish company Vattenfall, which owns the Hemwegcentrale, stated to be open for discussion about the closure of the plant. Essent, the owner of Eemshavencentrale, on the other hand, sought the confrontation; they believed that the closure of the plants would only work counterproductively in reaching the energy goals. Henk Kamp, the Minister of Economic Affairs, promised that the Dutch government would make a decision by the autumn of 2016. This decision could lead to another large breakthrough in policies for the energy sector in the Netherlands.

In January 2016, as planned, the three oldest coal-firing plants were closed, in Nijmegen, Borssele and Geertruidenberg. Two more closures are scheduled for 1 July 2017: Maasvlakte I and II.

2017 Energy Agreement debate 
In the end of January 2017, minister Kamp sent a letter to the House of Representatives that no decision would be made by the incumbent government on the closure of the remaining five coal plants. Instead of a concrete plan, the minister sent a study to the House, which he had carried out by the German research agency Frontier Economics, as well as the final advice of the individual members of the advisory group with whom the minister had been constantly consulted on this matter. These include VNO-NCW, FNV, environmental organisations and the VEMW. They did not agree on a common position and hence the difficult issue of the coal-fired power stations would be passed over the elections, which took place 15 March 2017.

2018 ban on coal-fired power plants 
On 18 May 2018, Minister of Economic Affairs and Climate Policy Eric Wiebes announced that the Netherlands would ban the use of coal in electricity generation by the end of 2029. Two of the five remaining coal-fired plants (Amercentrale Unit 9 & Hemweg 8) would have to shut down at the end of 2024 unless they switch primary fuels.

See also 
 Energy in the Netherlands
 Renewable energy in the Netherlands

References

External links
 Report on the Dutch power system (PDF 1.64 MB), September 2014 
 Green energy suppliers report October 2017 
https://iea.blob.core.windows.net/assets/0ac723e3-b89e-4bd6-b262-ee862493371a/NL-2020-Launch-Presentation.pdf